The Canton of Raon-l'Étape is a French administrative and electoral grouping of communes in the Vosges département of eastern France and in the region of Grand Est. The canton has its administrative centre at Raon-l'Étape.

Composition
At the French canton reorganisation which came into effect in March 2015, the canton was expanded from 9 to 40 communes:

Allarmont
Anglemont
Ban-de-Sapt
Bazien
Belval
Brû
Celles-sur-Plaine
Châtas
Denipaire
Domptail
Doncières
Étival-Clairefontaine
Grandrupt
Hurbache
Luvigny
Ménarmont
Ménil-de-Senones
Ménil-sur-Belvitte
Le Mont
Moussey
Moyenmoutier
Nompatelize
Nossoncourt
La Petite-Raon
Le Puid
Raon-l'Étape
Raon-sur-Plaine
Roville-aux-Chênes
Saint-Benoît-la-Chipotte
Sainte-Barbe
Saint-Jean-d'Ormont
Saint-Pierremont
Saint-Remy
Saint-Stail
Le Saulcy
Senones
Le Vermont
Vexaincourt  
Vieux-Moulin
Xaffévillers

References

Raon-l'Etape